

Group 2 

All times are local

2